The Queen Mother Pedagogical Institute, was a women's pedagogical high school, created in 1933 in Tirana, Albania.

The Institute, approved by Government Decree  nr. 666 on October 2, 1933, opened its doors on November 30, 1933. The school opened with 388 students, of which 100 were residents of Tirana, and the others non residents. The institute was a merger of an American school in Kavajë, Christo Dako's school for misses “Qiriazi”, the Stigmatines women's school of Shkoder, and the Normal Women's School of Korçë.

The institute is named after Queen Mother Sadijé Toptani, mother of King Zog.

In arts

The Institute is part of the movie Vajzat me kordele te kuqe, a 1978 production of the Kinostudjo Shqiperia e Re.

Notable alumni
Liri Belishova
Liri Gega
Ramize Gjebrea
Nexhmije Hoxha
Vito Kapo
Fiqrete Shehu
Margarita Tutulani

Notable faculty
Androniqi Zengo Antoniu

References

Educational institutions established in 1933
Secondary schools in Albania
Buildings and structures in Tirana
Education in Tirana
1933 establishments in Albania